Pelayo Correa is a Colombian pathologist.

Life and Work
A pathologist educated at the Universidad de Antioquia Medical School in Medellin, Colombia, and later employed at the Universidad del Valle Medical School in Cali, Colombia,  where he collaborated with epidemiologist, William Haenszel of the US National Cancer Institute, researching environmental causes of cancer in Colombia.  He had a particular interest in the etiology of gastric cancer.  Dr. Correa was born in Sonson, Colombia, July 3, 1927. Through his life, Correa has performed many jobs over the years. He started as part of the faculty at Universidad de Valle school of medicine in Cali in 1954 all the way until 1970. He became a visitor scientist for a couple of years at the US National Cancer institute Biometry Branch, where he continued to work with William Haenszel, and then became a full time professor in Pathology at the Medical Center of Louisiana at New Orleans. He was able to achieve the rank of Boyd professor, the highest academic rank among LSU staff.” (Fontham, 2010).  He continued to work there until Hurricane Katrina destroyed the Charity Hospital in New Orleans, and his lifetime collection of pathology specimens was lost.  “Recognized for his expertise in gastroenterology, he was given an award by the American Gastroenterological Association (AGA) for his individual contributions research in this field of science” (Stuart, 2013). He also served on the World Health Organization for several years for his research on Helicobacter pylori bacteria which was later classified as a class 1 carcinogen.

After the destruction of Charity Hospital in New Orleans, Correa obtained a new position as professor of pathology at Vanderbilt University after becoming a full time member. “He ended up founding the cancer registry in Cali, Colombia. He also was the leader in development in SEER Louisiana cancer registry” (Fontham, 2010). Over the course of his life he has published over 550 papers and book chapters and earned the title of Principal Investigator for the NCI program project on the etiology of gastric cancer. According to Dr. Peek, “Dr. Correa's contributions to the field of gastric carcinogenesis are protean, as he was the first investigator to define histologic stages in the canonical progression to intestinal-type gastric adenocarcinoma, years prior to the discovery of H. pylori.” (Newman 2017)

Sources:

References

1927 births
Living people
Colombian pathologists
Louisiana State University faculty
University of Antioquia alumni
Academic staff of the University of Valle